The Saint Helena football team is a representative football team of Saint Helena, organised by the Saint Helena Football Association. The team is not affiliated with any confederation or FIFA.

History
The team made its international debut in June 2019 when participating in the 2019 Inter Games Football Tournament. Previously, St. Helena had played one previous fixture in 1949 against English side Lockheed Leamington as the Friday 18 November 1949 issue of the Leamington Courier notes 'Lockheed beat St. Helena 15–3, the visiting team coming from the island of St. Helena'.

Results
Saint Helena's score first.

Competitive record

Island Games

Current squad 

The following players have been called up for the 2019 Inter Games Football Tournament.

|-
! colspan="9"  style="background:#b0d3fb; text-align:left;"|
|- style="background:#dfedfd;"

|-
! colspan="9"  style="background:#b0d3fb; text-align:left;"|
|- style="background:#dfedfd;"

|-
! colspan="9"  style="background:#b0d3fb; text-align:left;"|
|- style="background:#dfedfd;"

References

 
F
Football in Saint Helena